Małdyty  is a village in Ostróda County, Warmian-Masurian Voivodeship, in northern Poland. It is the seat of the gmina (administrative district) called Gmina Małdyty.

The village has a population of 1,410.

References

Villages in Ostróda County